Mason McDonald (born April 23, 1996) is a Canadian professional ice hockey goaltender who is currently an unrestricted free agent. He most recently played under contract to the Tulsa Oilers of the ECHL. He was selected by the Calgary Flames, 34th overall, in the 2014 NHL Entry Draft.

Playing career
Previously, he was selected 20th overall in the Quebec Major Junior Hockey League Entry Draft for 2012 to play for Acadie–Bathurst Titan. In the midst of his second season with the Titans in 2013–14, McDonald was traded to the Charlottetown Islanders on December 28, 2013. 

After his first two seasons in the QMJHL, McDonald was the first goalie drafted, in the 2014 NHL Entry Draft, 34th overall by the Calgary Flames.
On July 2, 2015, McDonald was signed to a three-year entry-level contract with the Calgary Flames.

At the conclusion of his entry-level contract with the Flames, having been unable to make progression within the organization, McDonald was released as a free agent after he was not tendered a qualifying offer on June 25, 2019. Unable to secure another NHL contract, McDonald agreed to a one-year AHL deal with the Colorado Eagles, affiliate to the Colorado Avalanche on July 25, 2019. He did not feature during his contract with the Eagles, assigned exclusively to play in the ECHL with affiliate, the Utah Grizzlies.

International play
McDonald was one of three goaltenders who represented Canada at the 2016 World Junior Hockey Championships.

Career statistics

Regular season and playoffs

International

References

External links

1996 births
Living people
Acadie–Bathurst Titan players
Adirondack Thunder players
Calgary Flames draft picks
Canadian ice hockey goaltenders
Charlottetown Islanders players
Kansas City Mavericks players
Ice hockey people from Nova Scotia
Sportspeople from Halifax, Nova Scotia
Stockton Heat players
Tulsa Oilers (1992–present) players
Utah Grizzlies (ECHL) players